Euphaedra subprotea is a butterfly in the family Nymphalidae. It is found in Cameroon, Gabon, the Republic of the Congo and the western part of the Democratic Republic of the Congo.

References

Butterflies described in 1986
subprotea